Mats Kristoffer Olsson (born 30 June 1995) is a Swedish professional footballer who plays as a midfielder for Danish club FC Midtjylland, on loan from Belgian club Anderlecht, and the Sweden national team.

Club career

Early career
Born in Norrköping in Sweden, Olsson started his career at IK Sleipner. When he was 13, Olsson was offered a trial at English club Chelsea, however he didn't attend and subsequently moved to IFK Norrköping. When he was 16, Olsson garnered interest by European clubs such as Juventus and Ajax, as well as domestically from IFK Göteborg. However, he signed for Arsenal in 2011 for £200,000 after having spent two previous trial periods with Arsenal. While on trial at Arsenal, he played for Arsenal's under-16s against Crystal Palace and was invited to take part in the Ferrolli Cup and the Nike Cup as a result of his performances. Olsson revealed that it was the drive of Arsenal Academy manager, Liam Brady, who persuaded Arsène Wenger to sign him, that persuaded Olsson himself to sign for Arsenal.

Arsenal

Olsson first played for Arsenal during their 2013 pre-season tour of the Far East. He scored his first goal for Arsenal against the Indonesia national team at Gelora Bung Karno Stadium, Jakarta following a cross from Tomáš Rosický. Olsson made his full competitive debut for Arsenal on 25 September 2013 as an 84th-minute substitute for Isaac Hayden in a League Cup game against West Bromwich Albion, in which he scored a penalty kick where Arsenal came out winners and proceeded to the next round.

FC Midtjylland
On 2 September 2014, Arsenal announced that Olsson moved to FC Midtjylland in Denmark on loan until the end of 2014. He made his debut for the club in a 3–2 home win against OB Odense, coming on for Pione Sisto in the 78th minute. On 27 December 2014, the Danish club announced that a permanent deal had been agreed with Arsenal to make Olsson's loan move permanent, with the player himself signing a new three-and-a-half year contract.

AIK
On 31 January 2017, Olsson signed for Allsvenskan club AIK.

Krasnodar
On 7 January 2019, it was announced that Olsson had signed a contract with FC Krasnodar of the Russian Premier League.

Anderlecht
On 21 July 2021, he signed a four-year contract with Belgian club Anderlecht.

Loan to FC Midtjylland 
On 31 August 2022, Olsson returned to his former club FC Midtjylland on a season-long loan deal with a purchase option.

International career
Olsson has represented Sweden at various youth levels and his style of play has been compared to former Swedish Arsenal players such as Freddie Ljungberg and Sebastian Larsson. In January 2015 he received his first call up to the senior Sweden squad for friendlies against Ivory Coast and Finland. However, in his first training session with the team he broke his leg. Olsson was, in May 2017, called up to the Sweden's squad for the 2017 UEFA European Under-21 Championship to be held in Poland.

On 20 November 2018, Olsson played his first competitive match for Sweden against Russia at Friends Arena in Stockholm, in the 2018–19 UEFA Nations League. Olsson started in the midfield and played almost the entire match. It ended as a 2–0 victory for the home side, which earned Sweden promotion to League A in the next edition of the tournament, as well as a play-off spot for UEFA Euro 2020.

Career statistics

Club

International
.

Honours

Midtjylland
 Superliga: 2014–15

AIK
 Allsvenskan: 2018

Sweden U21
 UEFA European Under-21 Championship: 2015

References

External links
 
 

1995 births
Sportspeople from Norrköping
Living people
Swedish footballers
Sweden international footballers
Sweden youth international footballers
Sweden under-21 international footballers
Association football midfielders
Arsenal F.C. players
FC Midtjylland players
AIK Fotboll players
FC Krasnodar players
R.S.C. Anderlecht players
Danish Superliga players
Allsvenskan players
Russian Premier League players
Belgian Pro League players
UEFA Euro 2020 players
Swedish expatriate footballers
Expatriate footballers in England
Expatriate men's footballers in Denmark
Expatriate footballers in Russia
Expatriate footballers in Belgium
Swedish expatriate sportspeople in England
Swedish expatriate sportspeople in Denmark
Swedish expatriate sportspeople in Russia
Swedish expatriate sportspeople in Belgium
Footballers from Östergötland County